A. concinna may refer to:

 Acacia concinna, a climbing shrub
 Acontista concinna, an Ecuadorian praying mantis
 Aegialia concinna, a beetle endemic to the United States
 Aiphanes concinna, an American spiny palm
 Alcadia concinna, a land snail
 Amalda concinna, a sea snail
 Ampelocissus concinna, an Angolan climbing vine
 Amphiura concinna, a brittle star
 Anatoma concinna, a sea snail
 Antennulariella concinna, a sac fungus
 Anathallis concinna, a flowering plant
 Areca concinna, a flowering plant
 Argia concinna, a pond damselfly